This is a list of people from Oldham, in North West England. The demonym of Oldham is Oldhamer; however, this list may include people from Chadderton, Failsworth, Lees, Royton, Saddleworth, and Shaw and Crompton, all from the wider Metropolitan Borough of Oldham. This list is arranged alphabetically by surname:

A 
 Sir Elkanah Armitage (1794–1876) – industrialist and Mayor of Manchester; born in Failsworth
 Mike Atherton (born 1968) – broadcaster, journalist and retired cricketer for Lancashire and England; born in Failsworth

B 
 Vera Baird KC (born 1950) – Labour politician, author and barrister
 Bobby Ball (1944–2020) – one half of comedy double act Cannon and Ball; born in Boundary Park General Hospital
 Tony Barber (born 1940) − radio and television host and Gold Logie winner
 Lydia Becker (1827–1890) – leading 19th-century suffragette, born in Chadderton's Foxdenton Hall
 Hannah Beswick (1688–1758) – woman who was so afraid of being buried alive that she insisted on her body being embalmed and kept above ground
 Christopher Biggins (born 1948) – television presenter, pantomime actor and winner of 2007's I'm a Celebrity...Get Me Out of Here!
 Scholes Birch (1826–1910) – first-class cricketer
 Lally Bowers (1914–1984) – actress, and next door neighbour to Dora Bryan
 Helen Bradley (1900–1979) – 20th-century oil painter born in Lees in 1900
 Benjamin Brierley (1825–1896) – Failsworth-born weaver, poet and writer in Lancashire dialect
 Louise Brown (born 1978) – world's first baby conceived by in vitro fertilisation; born in Oldham General Hospital
 Dora Bryan (1923–2014) – Parbold-born actress, best known for her role in A Taste of Honey and as Roz in Last of the Summer Wine
 Will Buckley (born 1989) – footballer for Sunderland

C 
 Tommy Cannon (born 1938) – one half of comedy double act Cannon and Ball
 Ronald Castree (born 1953) – murderer convicted for the killing of Lesley Molseed
 Laurence Chaderton (–1640) – one of the original translators of the Authorized King James Version of the Bible
 Brian Clarke (born 1953) – Oldham-born architectural artist and painter known for his work in stained glass
 J. R. Clynes (1869–1949) – Labour politician, Leader of the Labour Party, 1921–22
 Olivia Cooke (born 1993) – TV and film actress known for Bates Motel, "Ouija" and "Me and Earl and the Dying Girl"; from Oldham
 Jodie Connor (born 1981) – recording artist, lyricist, fashion model and goodwill ambassador for The Prince's Trust; from Shaw and Crompton
 Nicholas Connor (born 1999) – film director, born in Oldham
 Carl Cox (born 1962) – record producer and DJ, born in Oldham
 Brian Cox (born 1968) – Chadderton-born television presenter, particle physicist, Royal Society research fellow, and professor at the University of Manchester
 Bernard Cribbins (1928–2022) – character actor and musical comedian
 Don Cupitt (born 1934) – English philosopher of religion and scholar of Christian theology

D 
 Agyness Deyn (born 1983) – Failsworth-raised supermodel

E 
 Paul Edwards (born 1947) – ex-association footballer who played for Manchester United, Oldham Athletic and Stockport County
 Karen Elson (born 1979) – Chadderton-raised supermodel and singer-songwriter

F 
 Kate Fenton (born 1954) – Failsworth-born novelist and former BBC radio producer
 Siobhan Finneran (born 1966) – Oldham-born television, film and theatre actress; Happy Valley and The Loch
 George Ford (born 1993) – Oldham-born England rugby union player
 Des Foy (born 1963) – Great Britain, Ireland and Oldham rugby league footballer; Director of Rugby League Ireland
 Roy Fuller (1912–1991) – Failsworth-born writer, known mostly as a poet

G 
 Ian Greaves (1932–2009) – Shaw and Crompton-born association football player and manager; one of the Busby Babes
 Nick Grimshaw (born 1984) – television presenter and DJ; raised in Oldham
 Shobna Gulati (born 1966) – Oldham-born actress, writer and dancer

H 
 Terry Hall (1926–2007) – pioneering ventriloquist and early children's television entertainer
 Philip Gilbert Hamerton (1834–1894) – etcher, painter and art critic; born in Crompton in 1834
 Graham Harding (born 1966) – cricketer
 Paul Harrison (born 1945) – Oldham-born writer on environment and development; founder of the World Pantheist Movement
 Jack Hilton (1900–1983) – British novelist, essayist, and travel writer
 John Hogan (1884–1943) – Royton-born recipient of the Victoria Cross, the highest military decoration awarded for valour "in the face of the enemy" to members of the British and Commonwealth forces
 Prof Arthur Cyril William Hutchinson FRSE (1889–1969) – professor of dentistry

I 
 Inspiral Carpets – Madchester/indie rock band

J 
 Nicole Jackson (born 1992) – professional ice hockey player for Göteborg HC and the Great Britain women's national ice hockey team
 Lee Jasper (born 1958) – race equality activist and champion of over 30 years originally from Manchester
 Suranne Jones (born 1978) – Chadderton-born actress who played Karen McDonald in Coronation Street
 William Joyce (1906–1946) – Brooklyn-born fascist politician and Nazi propagandist; short-term resident of Glodwick in Oldham

K 
 Annie Kenney (1879–1953) – one of the first suffragettes to be imprisoned for protesting for women's suffrage
 Ian Kershaw (born 1943) – historian, regarded by many as one of the world's leading experts on Adolf Hitler and Nazi Germany
 Anne Kirkbride (1954–2015) – soap opera actress best known for playing Deirdre Barlow in Coronation Street
 Jack Kirkbride (1923–2006) – cartoonist who worked for the Oldham Evening Chronicle
 John Kneller (1916–2009) – English-American professor and fifth President of Brooklyn College
 Barbara Knox (born 1933) – soap opera actress best known for playing Rita Sullivan in Coronation Street

L 

 Sarah Lancashire (born 1964) – Oldham-born television actress
 John Lees – Royton-born inventor who made a substantial improvement to machinery for carding cotton in 1772
 Joseph Lees (1748–1824) – regional dialect poet from Glodwick; wrote Jone o Grinfilt
 Ralf Little (born 1980) – television actor, best known for his roles in The Royle Family and Two Pints of Lager and a Packet of Crisps
 Eric Longworth (1918–2008) – Shaw-born actor, best known for his semi-regular part in sitcom Dad's Army, as the town clerk of Walmington-on-Sea

M 
 Michelle Marsh (born 1982) – glamour model and page 3 girl
 Matthew Maynard (born 1966) – former England Test cricketer
 William McDougall (1871–1938) – Chadderton-born psychologist and writer of several highly influential textbooks
 Liz McInnes (born 1959) – former Labour MP of the House of Commons
 Fergus Mills (1840–1924) – member of the Wisconsin State Assembly
 Simon Moore (born 1974) – cricketer

N 
 N-Trance – dance music producers

O 
 Kieran O'Brien (born 1973) – actor who gained notoriety for his role in the 2004 film 9 Songs
 Mark Owen (born 1972) – member of boyband Take That; born and raised in Oldham

P 
 David Platt (born 1966) – association footballer, formerly captain of the England national football team; born in Chadderton
 Tony Prince (born 1944) – British radio disc jockey and businessman

R 
 Tony Radakin (born 1965) – senior Royal Navy officer
 Akke Rahman (born 1982) – British Bengali mountaineer
 Alan Rankle (born 1952) – artist
 Jim Ratcliffe (born 1952) – founder and CEO of Ineos, raised in Failsworth
 Hervey Rhodes, Baron Rhodes (1895–1987) – Greenfield-born Labour party politician and life peer
 Andy Ritchie (born 1960) – former Oldham Athletic player and manager
 Roy Rolland (1921–1997) – comedian and stage actor who appeared as Old Mother Riley from the 1950s to 1980s
 Alan Rothwell (born 1937) – actor and television presenter
 Clive Rowe (born 1964) – actor

S 
 Sahil Saeed (born 2004) – British Pakistani from Shaw and Crompton who was kidnapped for ransom in Pakistan in 2010
 Phillip Schofield (born 1962) – Oldham-born television presenter
 Paul Sculthorpe (born 1977) – England and St Helens RLFC player and captain
 Edward Sinclair (1914–1977) – television actor, Dad's Army
 Kevin Sinfield (born 1980) – England and Leeds RLFC player and captain
 Nicola Stephenson (born 1971) – television actress
 Philip Sydney Stott, 1st Baronet (1858–1937) – Chadderton-born architect, civil engineer and surveyor of cotton mills
 William Stott (1857–1900) – impressionist painter
 Eric Sykes (1923–2012) – comedy writer and actor
 Glenn Simon – Dwarf Fireman and Monopoly tycoon from the Oldham borough of Failsworth.

T 
 Henry Taylor (1885–1951) – British Olympic freestyle swimming triple gold medallist and champion
 Kevin Thaw (born 1967) – alpinist, climber; many first and notable ascents, member of the North Face climbing team, Altitude Everest Expedition 2007
 Stephen Timms (born 1955) – British Labour Party politician and Member of Parliament
 Geoff Tootill (1922–2017) – Chadderton-born scientist helped create the Manchester Baby in 1948, the world's first wholly electronic stored program computer
 Dame Eva Turner, DBE (1892–1990) – soprano opera singer; born in Werneth
 Twisted Wheel – punk rock trio; reside in Oldham
 The Tides—Liam Pennington's indie band, Oldham born and bred

W 
 Jane Walsh – writer
 Paul Walsh (born 1955) – Chadderton-born Chief Executive of Diageo
 Sir William Walton (1902–1983) – composer and conductor
 Darren Wharton (born 1961) – keyboardist for rock band Thin Lizzy
 Nicola White (born 1988) – hockey player for England and Team GB
 Annie Whitehead (born 1955) – jazz trombone player
 Ronald Whittam (born 1925) - physiologist
 Ricky Whittle (born 1979) – Oldham-born model and actor
 Jack Wild (1952–2006) – Royton-born Academy Award-nominated actor, best known for his role as the Artful Dodger in the 1968 musical film Oliver!
 Phil Woolas MP (born 1959) – Lincolnshire-born politician representing Oldham East and Saddleworth; lives in Lees
 Arthur Worsley (1920–2001) – Failsworth-born ventriloquist; appeared regularly on British television from the 1950s to the 1970s

References

Bibliography

External links 
 Famous Sons & Daughters, a page from visitoldham.co.uk

 
Oldham
Oldham